Tatar-e Olya, also known as Tatar-e Bala, may refer to:
 Tatar-e Olya, East Azerbaijan
 Tatar-e Olya, Golestan